Sebastian Marek Karpiniuk (4 December 1972 – 10 April 2010) was a Polish politician.

Political career 
Karpiniuk was an assistant to President of Kolobrzeg, Henryk Bienowski before becoming politically independent.

He was elected to the Sejm on 25 September 2005, getting 9767 votes in 40 Koszalin district, as a candidate from the Civic Platform list.  In the Parliamentary Election of 2007, he ran on the same ticket in the same district as second on the list, and was elected to the Sejm with 25,827 votes (incl. 8169 in Kolobrzeg).

He was listed on the flight manifest of the Tupolev Tu-154 of the 36th Special Aviation Regiment carrying the President of Poland Lech Kaczyński which crashed near Smolensk-North airport near Pechersk near Smolensk, Russia, on 10 April 2010, killing all on board.

To honor his memory, in April 2010, City Council of Kolobrzeg passed the resolution to name the newly built football stadium in Kolobrzeg "Sebastian Karpinuk". On 16 April 2010, Karpinuk was posthumously awarded the Commander's Cross of the Order of Polonia Restituta.

Personal life 
Sebastian Karpiniuk was born in Kołobrzeg. He attended the Mikolaj Kopernik secondary school in Kolobrzeg and studied law in Gdańsk. Until his death, he lived for many years in a block of apartments at Waska street in Kolobrzeg. His mother died when he was a teenager as a result of fire in their apartment. His father was elected to the City Council in the local government elections of November 2010.

See also
 Members of Polish Sejm 2005-2007

References

External links
 Sebastian Karpiniuk - parliamentary page - includes declarations of interest, voting record, and transcripts of speeches.
 Plane crash with Polish officials - includes list of victims in Polish

Members of the Polish Sejm 2005–2007
Civic Platform politicians
1972 births
2010 deaths
People from Kołobrzeg
Knights of the Order of Polonia Restituta
Victims of the Smolensk air disaster
University of Gdańsk alumni
Members of the Polish Sejm 2007–2011